Moral is a ghost town in Pottawatomie County, Oklahoma.

References

Ghost towns in Oklahoma